Phongmed Gewog (Dzongkha: ཕོངས་མེད་) is a gewog (village block) of Trashigang District, in the East of Bhutan.

References

Armington, S. (2002) Bhutan. (2nd ed.) Melbourne: Lonely Planet.

Populated places in Bhutan
Gewogs of Bhutan
Trashigang District